NorthWood High School is a high school located in Nappanee, Indiana, United States. It is a part of the Wa-Nee Community School System, shared with Wakarusa.

Demographics
In the 2020-21 school year, total enrollment was 891 students.

In the 2020-21 school year the ethnicity breakdown was:
 White - 85.2%
 Hispanic - 8.5%
 Black - 2.1%
 Asian - 0.6%
 Multi-racial - 3.5%

Athletics
NorthWood High School's mascot is the panther and its colors are red and black. The school competes in the Northern Lakes Conference along with Concord, Elkhart Memorial, Goshen, Northridge, Wawasee, Plymouth, and Warsaw.

NorthWood's football team was state champion in 2005.

NorthWood's girls basketball team were state champions in 1999 and 2020, with 2020 being the lowest scoring girls basketball state championship in Indiana, with 66 combined points (the games score being the score of both teams added together).

See also
 List of high schools in Indiana

References

Public high schools in Indiana
Schools in Elkhart County, Indiana